The 2021–22 season was the 118th season in the existence of Hellas Verona F.C. and the club's third consecutive season in the top flight of Italian football. In addition to the domestic league, Hellas Verona participated in this season's edition of the Coppa Italia.

Season events
On 7 June 2021, Eusebio Di Francesco was unveiled as the new head coach, signing a two-year contract, until 30 June 2023, replacing Ivan Jurić who left the club earlier that day to take over the vacant manager role at Torino.

Players

First-team squad

Other players under contract

On loan

Transfers

Pre-season and friendlies

Competitions

Overall record

Serie A

League table

Results summary

Results by round

Matches
The league fixtures were announced on 14 July 2021.

Coppa Italia

Statistics

Appearances and goals

|-
! colspan=14 style="background:#000080; color:#FFFF00;; text-align:center| Goalkeepers

|-
! colspan=14 style="background:#000080; color:#FFFF00;; text-align:center| Defenders

|-
! colspan=14 style="background:#000080; color:#FFFF00;; text-align:center| Midfielders

|-
! colspan=14 style="background:#000080; color:#FFFF00;; text-align:center| Forwards

|-
! colspan=14 style="background:#000080; color:#FFFF00;; text-align:center| Players transferred out during the season

|-
!colspan=14 style="background:#000080; color:#FFFF00;; text-align:center| Players transferred out during the season

References

Hellas Verona F.C. seasons
Hellas Verona